The Curacao striped anole or striped anole (Anolis lineatus) is a species of lizard in the family Dactyloidae. It is native to Curaçao and Aruba of the Netherlands Antilles, but has also been introduced to Klein Curaçao. It is generally common (at least on Curaçao), and is particularly common in densely vegetated gardens in the capital Willemstad. It is found in dry tropical shrubland at all elevations in its range, but is uncommon in habitats without larger trees. It can often be seen on rocks, the walls of buildings or tree trunks; at various heights but often relatively close to the ground. It is a member of the A. chrysolepis species group.

It is overall light brownish with a dark-edged pale lateral stripe on each side, and typically several light bars on the body and tail. It has an orange-yellow dewlap with a blackish spot; the dewlap is significantly larger in males than in females. It is the only known species of anole where the dewlap is asymmetrically coloured, being deeper orange on one side and yellower on the other. In almost three-quarter of all individuals the left side is the most yellow. The colour difference between the two sides is indistinct in only a minority of the females.

References

L
Lizards of the Caribbean
Fauna of Aruba
Fauna of Curaçao
Reptiles described in 1802
Taxa named by François Marie Daudin